North Korea participated at the 16th Asian Games in Guangzhou, China.

Medal table

Medalists

Archery

Women

Athletics

Men 
Road events

Women 
Road events

Basketball

Men 

Team
An Yong BinChoe Song JinHo IlKim Chang MyongKim Un CholKye Kwang UO Jin CholO Jin HyokPak Myong JinPak Un CholRi Kum SongSin Kum Byol

Qualifying round

Group A

Preliminary round

Group E

Quarterfinals

Placings 5th–8th

Placings 7th–8th

Board games
Weiqi

Boxing

Canoeing

Canoe-Kayak Flatwater 

Men

Women

Diving

Men

Women

Football

Men

North Korea

Group C

1/8 finals

Quarter-finals

Women 

Hong Myong-HuiKim Kyong-HwaChoe Yong-SimSong Jong-SunRo Chol-OkHo Un-ByolJo Yun-MiRi Ye-GyongKim Yong-AeRa Un-SimRi Un-GyongKim Chung-SimYun Hyon-HiYu Jong-HuiJon Myong-HwaJo Yun-MiJong Pok-SimKong Hye-Ok

Group B

Semi-finals

Final

Handball

Women 

Han Jong-HyangHan Sol-GyongJong Yun-MiKang Un-HuiKil Mi-HyangKim Chun-YongKim Un-OkKwak Sun-OkMun Un-SukO Kyong-SunPak Yong-MiRi Hye-SongRo Myong-AYang Un-GyongYang Un-Sil

Preliminary round

Group B

Placement 5th–6th

Judo

Men

Women

Karate

Men

Women

Rowing

Men

Women

Shooting

Men

Women

 Ri Hyang-Sim was awarded bronze because of no three-medal sweep per country rule.

Soft Tennis

Synchronized swimming

Table Tennis

Volleyball

Women

Team
Choe RyonHan Ok-SimJong Jin-SimKim Hye-OkKim Kyong-SukKim Ok-HuiKim Un-JongKim Yong-MiMin Ok-JuNam Mi-HyangRi Hyon-SukRi Sun-Jong

Preliminary

Group B

|}

|}
Quarterfinals

|}
Semifinals

|}
Bronze medal match

|}

Weightlifting

Wrestling

Men
Freestyle

Greco-Roman

Women
Freestyle

Wushu

Women
Nanquan\Nangun

Sanshou

Korea, North
2010
Asian Games